Jessie Abbott (1897–1982) was a member of the Tuskegee Institute community and was married to Cleveland Abbott. Together they worked to create one of the first organized women's college athletic programs at Tuskegee. They coached the first all-Black girls' track team to enter the Olympics. Jessie Abbott acted as the secretary for  the wives of the presidents of Tuskegee as well as George Washington Carver.

Biography
She was born on 23 March 1897 and went to school in Des Moines, Iowa. She met her future husband, Cleveland Abbott, at the Drake Relays while he was a student at South Dakota State College. She died on 12 August 1982 in Tuskegee, Alabama.

References

External links
Jessie Abbott Interview Transcript, 1976-1981 OH-31. Schlesinger Library, Radcliffe Institute, Harvard University, Cambridge, Mass.

Black Women Oral History Project
African-American sportswomen
Tuskegee Golden Tigers track and field coaches
People from Des Moines, Iowa
1897 births
1982 deaths
20th-century African-American women
20th-century African-American people
20th-century American people